Bakić is a Bosnian and Serbo-Croatian surname. Notable people with the surname include:

Aleksandar Bakić (born 2000), Montenegrin handball player
Bojan Bakić (born 1983), Montenegrin basketball player
Boris Bakić (born 1986), Montenegrin basketball player
Dušan Bakić (born 1999), Montenegrin footballer
Jovo Bakić (born 1970), Serbian sociologist, former politician and an associate professor
Ljiljana Bakić (1939-2022), Serbian architect
Marko Bakić (born 1993), Montenegrin footballer
Mike Bakić (born 1952), Canadian football player of Serbian descent
Milija and Pavle Bakić, co-founders of Galatasaray
Mitar Bakić (1908-1960), Yugoslav politician, general and People's Hero of Yugoslavia
Pavle Bakić (c. 1484-1537), Serbian despot
Sonja Bakić (born 1984), Serbian singer
Tanja Bakić (born 1981), Montenegrin writer
Vojin Bakić (1915-1992), Croatian sculptor of Serbian descent

See also
 Bakić disambiguation
 Bakić noble family
 Bakich, anglicized variant

Croatian surnames
Serbian surnames
Montenegrin surnames